Turów  is a village in the administrative district of Gmina Głogów, within Głogów County, Lower Silesian Voivodeship, in south-western Poland.

The village has an approximate population of 150.

The name of the village is of Polish origin and comes from the word tur, which means "aurochs".

References

Villages in Głogów County